Chelrood is a village in Sheykh Fazlolah-e Nuri Rural District, Baladeh District, Nur County, Mazandaran Province, Iran. At the 2006 census, its population was 130 in 42 families.

References 

Populated places in Nur County